Ljubinj is a settlement southeast of Tolmin in the Littoral region of Slovenia.

The local church is dedicated to Saint Michael and belongs to the Parish of Tolmin.

References

External links
Ljubinj on Geopedia

Populated places in the Municipality of Tolmin